Whiskey Island may refer to:

 Whiskey Island (Cleveland), Ohio, a peninsula
 Whiskey Island (Lake Michigan), Michigan
 Whiskey Island, a literary journal published by Cleveland State University